Richard Lumley may refer to:

Richard Lumley, 1st Viscount Lumley (1589–1663), English royalist and military commander
Richard Lumley, 1st Earl of Scarbrough (1650–1721), English soldier and statesman
Richard Lumley, 2nd Earl of Scarbrough (1686–1740), British Whig politician
Richard Lumley, 9th Earl of Scarbrough (1813–1884), Anglo-Irish peer and soldier
Richard Lumley, 12th Earl of Scarbrough (1932–2004), English nobleman
Richard Lumley, 13th Earl of Scarbrough (born 1973), British peer

See also
Richard Lumley-Saunderson (disambiguation)